Mogambo (foaled 1983 in Kentucky) is a retired American Thoroughbred racehorse whose wins included a nine-length victory in the Grade I Champagne Stakes at Belmont Park in Elmont, New York. Bred and raced by Peter M. Brant, Mogambo was sired by the outstanding Champion stallion, Mr. Prospector. His dam was Lakeville Miss, the American Champion Two-Year-Old Filly of 1977.

Trained by National Museum of Racing and Hall of Fame inductee LeRoy Jolley, Mogambo retired having won four of his nineteen starts with earnings of $958,176.

Stud career
Mogambo's descendants include:

c = colt, f = filly

Pedigree

References

1983 racehorse births
Thoroughbred family 9-c
Racehorses bred in Kentucky
Racehorses trained in the United States
American Grade 1 Stakes winners